Vice Admiral Jonas Björnson Haggren (born 8 April 1964) is a senior officer in the Swedish Navy. He is currently serving as the Chief of Defence Staff and head of the Swedish Armed Forces Headquarters in Stockholm.

Career
Haggren attended the Swedish Navy Officers’ College (Marinens officershögskola, MOHS) from 1985 to 1987 when he received his commission as a naval officer and was promoted to acting sub-lieutenant (fänrik). Haggren graduated from the Swedish Navy Staff College (Marinens krigshögskola, MKHS) in 1991. In 1996, Haggren attended the Staff Officer Program at the Swedish National Defence College. Haggren passed the Management Program at the Swedish National Defence College from 2001 to 2002 and was promoted to commander.

In 2003, Haggren graduated from the Naval War College in the United States and from 2004 to 2005 he attended the International Course Security Policy at the Geneva Centre for Security Policy in Switzerland. Between 2002-2007 he was stationed at the Swedish Armed Forces Headquarters where he initially was responsible for military strategic planning regarding Swedish military deployment in Liberia (part of UNMIL) and the Democratic Republic of the Congo (part of MONUC). This period also included a 4 month tour at the Ministry of Defence as an advisor. On completion of the former task, Haggren worked with the European Capabilities Action Plan as part of the working group developing SOP's for the European Union Operational Headquarters (EU OHQ) and Force Headquarters (FHQ).

In 2006 he assumed the position of chief of staff of the 1st Submarine Flotilla in Karlskrona and in 2007 he was promoted to captain and assumed the position of commanding officer. In 2010 he was appointed head of the Naval Department Training and Procurement Staff (Produktionsledningens marinavdelning) and was at the same time promoted to rear admiral (lower half). After completion of his studies at the Royal College of Defence Studies in late summer 2014 Haggren was appointed to Force Commander 19th rotation between February and May 2015 in EU Naval Force (Operation Atalanta) in Somalia. On 13 February 2015, Haggren assumed command of Operation Atalanta's Force Headquarters (FHQ) during a ceremony held in Djibouti.

On the 28 November 2014 he was promoted to rear admiral and assumed duty as Chief of Policy and Plans Department in the Defence Staff in the Swedish Armed Forces Headquarters in Stockholm. On 20 September 2018, Haggren was promoted to vice admiral and appointed Chief of Defence Staff and head of the Swedish Armed Forces Headquarters, as well as commanding officer of the Swedish Armed Forces Special Forces.

Personal life
Haggren is married to Linda and they have three children.

Dates of rank
1987 – Acting sub-lieutenant
1991 – Sub-lieutenant
1994 – Lieutenant
1997 – Lieutenant commander
2005 – Commander
2007 – Captain
2010 – Rear admiral (lower half)
2014 – Rear admiral
2018 – Vice admiral

Awards and decorations

Swedish
  For Zealous and Devoted Service of the Realm
  Swedish Armed Forces Conscript Medal
  Swedish Armed Forces International Service Medal
  Swedish Navy League's Anchor of Honour (Föreningen Flottans Mäns hedersankare)
  National Association of Naval Volunteer Corps Medal of Merit (Sjövärnskårernas Riksförbunds förtjänstmedalj)

Foreign
   Commander of the Ordre national du Mérite (1 September 2022)
  European Security and Defence Policy Service Medal – EUNAVFOR ATALANTA

Honours
Member of the Royal Swedish Society of Naval Sciences (2008)
Member of the Royal Swedish Academy of War Sciences (2011)

References

Living people
1964 births
Swedish Navy vice admirals
Members of the Royal Swedish Society of Naval Sciences
Members of the Royal Swedish Academy of War Sciences
Naval War College alumni
Graduates of the Royal College of Defence Studies
Military personnel from Stockholm